Disparaît, v is a 2005 experimental science fiction film, directed by  Andrei Severny. The film combines 16mm film with early digital video. Disparaît, v was part of the official selection at Milano Film Festival in 2005 and 2013, Avignon Film Festival, MECAL Film Festival and Kolkata Film Festival. It was distributed and screened in multiple theaters in Italy by Esterni re-distribution in 2005-2012. The film was shot on location in New York City.

Synopsis
Guided by a distant voice on the phone, Jack has less than twelve hours to make his way through the city before something drastic changes his whole life. The story of the final journey set in the urban environment resolves with Jack s girlfriend leading him to the mystery of complete disappearance from this world.

References

External links
 Official website
 Disparaît, v on Vimeo
 

2005 films
2005 science fiction films
Films directed by Andrei Severny (filmmaker)
Films shot in New York City
2000s English-language films
American science fiction short films
Russian short films
Japanese short films
British science fiction short films
Russian science fiction films
Japanese science fiction films
2000s French-language films
American avant-garde and experimental films
Russian avant-garde and experimental films
Japanese avant-garde and experimental films
British avant-garde and experimental films
2000s American films
2000s British films
2000s Japanese films